Wild Boys of the Road is a 1933 pre-Code Depression-era American drama film directed by William Wellman and starring Frankie Darro, Rochelle Hudson, and Grant Mitchell. It tells the story of several teens forced into becoming hobos. The screenplay by Earl Baldwin is based on the story Desperate Youth by Daniel Ahern. In 2013, the film was selected for preservation in the United States National Film Registry by the Library of Congress as being "culturally, historically, or aesthetically significant".

Plot
One Saturday night, Eddie Smith (Frankie Darro), Tommy Gordon (Edwin Phillips) and Eddie's girlfriend Grace (Rochelle Hudson) go to the high school prom. Casually chatting about the unemployment situation, Tommy tells Eddie that he is going to drop out of high school to look for work to help support his struggling family. Eddie offers to speak to his father (Grant Mitchell) about getting him a job, only to discover that his father has himself just lost his own job. Eddie sells his beloved car and gives the money to his father, but when his father remains unemployed, the bills keep piling up, and the family is threatened with eviction. Eddie and Tommy decide to leave home to ease the burden on their families. Eddie leaves a note, 
then they board a freight train, where they meet Sally (Dorothy Coonan), another teenager, who is hoping her aunt in Chicago can put her up for a while. They have to jump from the train, and end up in a milk transfer station, where many teens in similar dire straits hop aboard another train.

When they reach Chicago, they are met by the police, who inform them and other hobos that the unemployment crisis has hit Chicago as well. Most of the transients are sent to detention, but Sally has a letter from her aunt, so they let her through. She claims her companions are her cousins; the kindly policeman is skeptical, but lets them go. Sally's Aunt Carrie (Minna Gombell) welcomes all three into her apartment, which is in reality a brothel. She warmly welcomes the three, and starts to feed them, however, before they even have a chance to eat, the place is raided by the police. The trio hastily depart, climbing out a window, and continue their rail journey east.

Nearing Columbus, one girl (Ann Hovey), caught alone in a railcar, is raped by the train brakeman (an uncredited Ward Bond). When the others find out, they start punching the assailant. By accident, the brakeman falls out of the train to his death. A little later, as the train approaches the city, everyone jumps off. Tommy hits his head on a switch and falls across the track in front of an oncoming train. He crawls desperately towards safety, but his foot gets mangled and his leg has to be amputated. They live in "Sewer Pipe City" near Cleveland for a while, until the city authorities decide to shut it down to discourage vagrancy, prompted in part to Eddie's theft of a misfitting prosthetic leg for Tommy.
  
Finally, the three end up living in the New York Municipal Dump. Eddie finally lands a job, but needs to find $3 to pay for a coat which the job requires. They panhandle to raise the money. When two men offer Eddie $5 to deliver a note to a movie theater cashier across the street, he jumps at the chance. The note turns out to be a demand for money. Eddie is arrested, and the other two are taken in as well when they protest. The judge (Robert Barrat) cannot get any information out of them, particularly about their parents. However, Eddie's embittered speech moves him. He dismisses the charges and promises to get Eddie's job back for him. He also promises to help the other two, and assures them that their parents will magically be back to work soon.

Cast

Accolades
In December 2013, the film was selected for the 2013 National Film Registry.

See also
 Miss Nobody (1926) - directed by Lambert Hillyer
 Beggars of Life (1928) - directed by William Wellman

References

External links
Wild Boys of the Road essay by Gwendolyn Audrey Foster at National Film Registry
 Nothing Sacred: The Cinema of William Wellman by John Andrew Gallagher and Frank Thompson. Men With Wings Press, 2018. , pages 232-238.
 
 
 
 
 Letter suggesting changes to film to comply with the Hays Code, from www.thechiseler.me

1933 films
1933 drama films
1930s teen drama films
American teen drama films
American black-and-white films
1930s English-language films
Films directed by William A. Wellman
Rail transport films
First National Pictures films
United States National Film Registry films
1930s American films
Films scored by Bernhard Kaun